Lakenan is an unincorporated community in Shelby County, in the U.S. state of Missouri.

History
Lakenan was laid out in 1858 when the railroad was extended to the area.  The community has the name of Robert F. Lakenan, a railroad promoter. A post office called Lakenan was in operation from 1859 until 1968.

References

Unincorporated communities in Missouri
Unincorporated communities in Shelby County, Missouri